Rho GTPase activating protein 27 is a protein that in humans is encoded by the ARHGAP27 gene.

Function

This gene encodes a member of a large family of proteins that activate Rho-type guanosine triphosphate (GTP) metabolizing enzymes. The encoded protein may play a role in clathrin-mediated endocytosis. Alternatively spliced transcript variants encoding multiple isoforms have been observed for this gene. [provided by RefSeq, Aug 2013].

References

External links 
 PDBe-KB provides an overview of all the structure information available in the PDB for Human Rho GTPase-activating protein 27 (ARHGAP27)